Zameni (also Romanized as Ẕāmenī and Zamenī; also known as Ẕāmenī-ye Bālā and Zāmenī-ye ‘Olyā) is a village in Rostam-e Yek Rural District, in the Central District of Rostam County, Fars Province, Iran. At the 2006 census, its population was 891, in 196 families.

References 

Populated places in Rostam County